Marcinowice may refer to the following places in Poland:
Marcinowice, Jawor County in Lower Silesian Voivodeship (south-west Poland)
Marcinowice, Świdnica County in Lower Silesian Voivodeship (south-west Poland)
Marcinowice, Lesser Poland Voivodeship (south Poland)
Marcinowice, Lubusz Voivodeship (west Poland)